Baptist College, is a college in Kohima, Nagaland, India. The college is managed and sponsored by the Angami Baptist Church Council. It offers undergraduate courses in Arts and Commerce and is affiliated to the Nagaland University. The college was established in 1982.

Departments

Arts and Commerce
English 
History
Political Science
Sociology
Commerce

Accreditation
The college is recognized by the University Grants Commission (UGC).

References

External links
http://www.baptistcollege.in/

Education in Kohima
Colleges affiliated to Nagaland University
Universities and colleges in Nagaland
1982 establishments in Nagaland
Educational institutions established in 1982